"Allentown" is a song by American singer Billy Joel. It is the lead track on Joel's 1982 album The Nylon Curtain, accompanied by a conceptual music video. Upon its release, and especially in subsequent years, "Allentown" emerged as an anthem of blue-collar America, representing both the aspirations and frustrations of America's working class in the late 20th century. 

"Allentown" reached No. 17 on the Billboard Hot 100, spending six consecutive weeks at that position and certified gold. It was No. 43 on Billboard's year-end Hot 100 chart for 1983. The song later appeared on Joel's Greatest Hits: Volume II (1985), Концерт (1987), 2000 Years: The Millennium Concert (2000), The Essential Billy Joel (2001), 12 Gardens Live (2006), The Hits (2010), and Live at Shea Stadium (2011) albums.

Theme

The song's theme centers around the resilience of Allentown, Pennsylvania and the region in the 1980s as it coped with the decline of its historically strong manufacturing sector and the emergence of the Rust Belt in the latter part of the 20th century, including the depressed, blue-collar livelihood of Allentown residents following Bethlehem Steel's decline and eventual closure.

The introductory rhythm for the song is designed to be the sound of a rolling mill converting steel ingots into I-beams or other shapes. Such a sound was commonly heard throughout South Bethlehem when the Bethlehem Steel plant was in operation from 1857 through 1995.

Joel regards the song as being "hopeful" towards the plight of the unemployed steel workers.  Even though the lyrics tell a sad tale, Joel says the song's message is "we're not moving out or giving up...we're going to try."

History
When Joel started writing the song, it was titled "Levittown," after the Long Island town next to Hicksville where Joel grew up. He originally wrote a chord progression and lyrics for the song, but struggled for a topic for the song. Joel remembered reading about the decline of the steel industry in the Lehigh Valley, which includes the cities of both Bethlehem and Allentown. Although Joel started writing the song in the late 1970s, it was not finished until 1982. The booklet in the 2-CD set Greatest Hits Volumes 1 and 2 lists the song as "copyrighted 1981" on page 17.

When Joel performed the song in Leningrad during a 1987 concert in the Soviet Union that was recorded and later released as Концерт, he introduced the song by analogizing the situation to that then faced by Soviet youths: "This song is about young people living in the Northeast of America. Their lives are miserable because the steel factories are closing down. They desperately want to leave... but they stay because they were brought up to believe that things were going to get better. Maybe that sounds familiar."

Critical reception
In November 1982, Cashbox wrote that, "The melody is a great deal more upbeat than the lyrics would indicate, but the message comes through nonetheless."  Billboard said that "it uses expert pop structure to put over a message of bleak suburban despair."

Reception in Allentown
The song met with mixed responses in Allentown. Some criticized the song as degrading and full of working-class stereotypes. But when Joel returned to the area after the album's release and the song became a hit, he was awarded the key to the city by Allentown's mayor, who praised it as "a gritty song about a gritty city."

On December 27, 1982, Joel played before a sold-out crowd at Stabler Arena in neighboring Bethlehem. He opened and closed his set at Stabler Arena with "Allentown," receiving a five-minute standing ovation following its second performance. At the end of the song and ovation, Joel was greeted with even more sustained applause when, in an apparent defense of the song's meaning, he pointedly told the Bethlehem crowd, "Don't take any shit from anybody." 

Also in 1983, Allentown's mayor Joseph Daddona sent a letter to Joel inquiring about Joel's willingness to share some royalties from the song for music scholarships in Allentown. Part of the letter read: "Not only would this fund be a great way to share a tiny part of your good fortune to others in Allentown, it would also help keep alive the 'Allentown' song and the Billy Joel legend (which you've already become here)."

Music video
The video, directed by Russell Mulcahy and featuring choreography by Kenny Ortega, was in heavy rotation on MTV during 1982 and 1983. The original version of the video features partial male nudity at the beginning when male coal miners are taking a shower, but that part was edited when it aired on MTV.

Other versions
"Allentown" also has been covered by other artists, including John Mellencamp, who performed a slower, acoustic version of the song at a Kennedy Center tribute to Billy Joel on November 19, 1994.

In the 2011 movie The Hangover Part II, Ed Helms sings a profane, modified version of "Allentown" to Zach Galifianakis as they ride in a boat in Thailand. The version appears on the film's soundtrack, The Hangover Part II: Original Motion Picture Soundtrack.

Charts

Weekly charts

Year-end charts

Certifications

References

External links
"Allentown" lyrics at BillyJoel.com
"Allentown", Live at Shea Stadium: The Concert at BillyJoel.com
"Allentown" official music video on YouTube
Billy Joel performs "Allentown" in Live from Leningrad, 1987 in Saint Petersburg, Soviet Union 

1982 singles
1982 songs
Billy Joel songs
Columbia Records singles
Culture of Allentown, Pennsylvania
Music videos directed by Russell Mulcahy
Songs about Pennsylvania
Songs about labor
Songs about poverty
Song recordings produced by Phil Ramone
Songs about cities in the United States
Songs written by Billy Joel
Working-class culture in the United States